Sir John Talbot Dillon, 1st Baronet, Baron Dillon (1739 – 17 July 1805) was an Irish politician and baronet.

Career
Dillon was the son of Arthur Dillon and Elizabeth Lambert, daughter of Ralph Lambert; and grandson of Sir John Dillon of Lismullen, knight, and Member of Parliament for Meath.  Dillon sat in the Parliament of Ireland, representing Wicklow Borough from 1771 to 1776, and then Blessington from 1776 to 1783.

Dillon may have spent time in Vienna, and enjoyed the favour of the Emperor Joseph II, from whom he received the title of Baron Dillon, of the Holy Roman Empire, on 4 July 1783. He used this title after recognition by King George III per Royal Licence on 22 February 1784. In the obituary notice in the Gentleman's Magazine for September 1805 it is said that this honour was conferred in recognition of his services in parliament on behalf of Catholics; and the date is given as 1782, which is repeated in the Baronetages of William Betham and Foster.

Family
Dillon married Millicent Drake in 1767, with whom he had one son Charles Drake Dillon, who succeeded him as second baronet. His first wife died on 28 May 1768. Dillon remarried the following year, to Sarah Miller, with whom he had five further sons and two daughters. He was created a baronet of the United Kingdom by King George III in 1801, and died in Dublin on 31 August 1805.

References

Note
Works published before the 1950s should be treated with caution, as these tend to conflate the two Dillons. These include for example

|-
of the Holy Roman Empire

1739 births
1805 deaths
Baronets in the Baronetage of the United Kingdom
Irish MPs 1769–1776
Irish MPs 1776–1783
Members of the Parliament of Ireland (pre-1801) for County Wicklow constituencies
People from County Meath
Cervantists
John